Manuel Tenenbaum (1934 – February 2, 2016) was a Uruguayan educator, historian and philanthropist. He was the author of books and articles about Jewish history. He served as the executive director of the Latin American Jewish Congress, the South American branch of the World Jewish Congress, from 1978 to 2007.

Early life
Manuel Tenenbaum was born in 1934 in Montevideo, Uruguay. His parents were Jewish immigrants from Poland.

Career
Tenenbaum was an educator. According to Haaretz, he was the "director of a secondary school in Montevideo, on the faculty of the Jewish teachers’ seminary and a college professor." Additionally, he was the author of several articles and books on Jewish history, including Talmud y derecho.

Tenenbaum served as the president of the Uruguay chapter of B'nai B'rith from 1972 to 1974. He went on to serve as the inaugural president of the Latin American Jewish Youth Council. He served as the president of the Central Jewish Committee of Uruguay from 1976 to 1978. He served as the president of the Latin American Jewish Congress, the South American branch of the World Jewish Congress, from 1978 to 2007.

Death
Tenenbaum died on February 1, 2016, in Montevideo, Uruguay, where he was buried. He was eighty-one years old.

Works

References

1934 births
2016 deaths
Writers from Montevideo
Uruguayan people of Polish-Jewish descent
Uruguayan educators
Uruguayan Jews
20th-century Uruguayan historians
Historians of Jews and Judaism
Uruguayan philanthropists
Jewish historians
Jewish philanthropists
Burials at Cementerio Israelita, La Paz
20th-century philanthropists
Uruguayan Zionists